The Manchester station group is a station group (for fares purposes) of four railway stations in Manchester city centre, England; this consists of Manchester Piccadilly, Manchester Oxford Road, Manchester Victoria and Deansgate. The station group is printed on national railway tickets as MANCHESTER STNS. For passengers travelling from one of the 91 National Rail stations in  Greater Manchester, the four stations are printed as MANCHESTER CTLZ which additionally permits the use of Metrolink tram services in Zone 1 (between Cornbrook, New Islington and Victoria).

The Manchester station group does not include Manchester Airport station, nor Salford Central railway station. Since the opening of the Ordsall Chord in 2017, there has been an increase of through as opposed to terminating services – for example, the TransPennine Express from Newcastle to Manchester Airport now calls at Victoria, Oxford Road and Piccadilly.

Rail passengers may board or disembark at any one of these four stations.  National visitors from outside Greater Manchester with MANCHESTER STNS as the destination are not permitted to use Metrolink in Zone 1, as it is a locally funded transport scheme and receives no national government subsidy.

When using the National Routeing Guide, Salford Central railway station is shown as part of the Manchester Group.  This means that tickets to or from Salford with 'Route: Any Permitted' have the same validity as those to or from MANCHESTER STNS, but cannot be used interchangeably.

Use in Metrolink Zone 1

Greater Manchester passengers
Passengers who travel on rail services from the Greater Manchester area into one of the four Manchester stations will be issued with a ticket stating the destination as Manchester CTLZ as opposed to Manchester Picc or Manchester Vic. This allows visitors to use Metrolink trams between stops in Zone 1 for free on the presentation of a Manchester CTLZ rail ticket. The Freedom of the City scheme was introduced in 2005 by GMPTE, now Transport for Greater Manchester. Zone 1 includes ten Metrolink tram stops:
Cornbrook (also in Zone 2)
Deansgate-Castlefield (railway station)
Exchange Square
Market Street
New Islington
Piccadilly (railway station)
Piccadilly Gardens
Shudehill
St Peter's Square
Victoria  (railway station)

National Rail passengers
Passengers travelling into Manchester from outside the Greater Manchester county are not permitted to use rail tickets to travel around the city centre on the Metrolink. As a consequence the destination on the orange rail tickets is stated as Manchester STNS. The Manchester Metrolink is a locally funded transport system which receives no national subsidy from central government. National Rail passengers can use the free buses outside stations to travel around the city centre.

Future

Many journeys which call at Manchester stations slow down due to the populated nature of Greater Manchester and congested routes; Network Rail have described it as a 'bottleneck'. In 2010 the Manchester hub study was released with a series of proposals to decreasing journey times.

The Ordsall Chord (also known as the Castlefield Curve) was opened in 2017, which now links all four of Manchester's main stations. Other proposals are yet to start construction. Two new through platforms will be built at Piccadilly and Victoria will be upgraded. The implementation of the Northern Hub proposals would reduce journey times to and from Liverpool by 15minutes, Leeds by 15minutes and Sheffield by 5minutes.

Stations

In use

Closed

One of the first inter-city railway stations in the world was Manchester Liverpool Road station on Liverpool Street. On 15 September 1830, the Liverpool and Manchester Railway opened and services terminated at the station. Part of the station frontage remains, as does the goods warehouse. Both of these structures are Grade I protected and are part of the Museum of Science and Industry.

All four of Manchester's termini (Piccadilly, Mayfield, Exchange and Victoria) were not recommended for closure in the first Beeching Report, but the reduced rail traffic caused by the closure of other railway lines meant services were transferred to Piccadilly and Victoria. Consequently, trains to Exchange and Central stations were withdrawn; the latter was granted Grade II* and later converted into an arena and exhibition centre.

See also
Station group

References

 
Railway stations in Salford